"Stars and Stripes on Iwo Jima" is a 1945 song by Bob Wills and His Texas Playboys.  The song was Bob Wills' second number one on the  Juke Box Folk charts, spending a single week at number one and a total of eleven weeks on the chart.  The B-side of "Stars and Stripes on Iwo Jima", a song entitled, "You Don't Care What Happens To Me" peaked at number five on the same chart.

Later in 1945, Sons of the Pioneers, peaked at number four on the Juke Box Folk Record chart with their version.

References
 

American patriotic songs
1945 songs
Bob Wills songs
Songs of World War II